The 2014–15 Iowa Hawkeyes women's basketball team will represent University of Iowa during the 2014–15 NCAA Division I women's basketball season. The Hawkeyes, led by fifteenth year head coach Lisa Bluder, play their home games at the Carver–Hawkeye Arena and were a members of the Big Ten Conference. They finish the season 26–8, 14–4 in Big Ten play to finish in second place. They advanced to the semifinals of the Big Ten women's basketball tournament where they lost to Ohio State. They received at-large bid of the NCAA women's tournament where they defeated American in the first round, Miami (FL) in the second round before falling to Baylor in the sweet sixteen.

Roster

Schedule

|-
!colspan=9 style="background:#000000; color:#FFCC00;"| Exhibition

|-
!colspan=9 style="background:#000000; color:#FFCC00;"| Non-conference regular season

|-
!colspan=9 style="background:#000000; color:#FFCC00;"| Big Ten regular season

|-
!colspan=9 style="background:#000000; color:#FFCC00;"| Big Ten Conference Women's Tournament

|-
!colspan=9 style="background:#000000; color:#FFCC00;"| NCAA Women's Tournament

Source

See also
2014–15 Iowa Hawkeyes men's basketball team

Rankings

References

Iowa Hawkeyes women's basketball seasons
Iowa
Iowa Hawkeyes women's basketball
Iowa Hawkeyes women's basketball
Iowa